KJJM-LD, virtual channel 34 (VHF digital channel 12), is a low-powered HSN-affiliated television station licensed to Dallas and Mesquite, Texas, United States and serving the Dallas–Fort Worth Metroplex. It is owned and operated by HC2 Holdings. It is not available on Charter Spectrum or FiOS from Frontier at this time.

History
The station was first established as K46EV on channel 46 as a FamilyNet affiliate, then on February 18, 2000, the call letters changed to KJJM. In 2005, the station  moved its broadcasts to channel 34 to make way for KTAQ's channel 46 digital signal, and switched affiliates to LAT TV in 2006.

For several weeks after LAT TV folded on May 20, 2008, KJJM was running a test pattern without FCC-required station IDs, putting the owners in danger of fines and other penalties. In September 2008, the station began broadcasting infomercials until the Universal Access Network was established in November 2008.

From November 2008 until June 2011, KJJM broadcast Universal Access Network programming, including the daily Access Live hosted by Pastor Lee Sherrell and produced at the KJJM studios. Weekend programming includes local Dallas ministry programs produced live at KJJM. The schedule also included syndicated programs, a handful of old movies, cartoons, classic TV shows including Bonanza, and programs from other sources.

In June 2011, Universal Access Network moved to KTAQ-DT2.

In June 2013, KJJM-LD was slated to be sold to Landover 5 LLC as part of a larger deal involving 51 other low-power television stations; the sale fell through in June 2016. Mako Communications sold its stations, including KJJM-LD, to HC2 Holdings in 2017.

On June 12, 2019, KJJM-LD shut down its channel 34 digital transmitter as a part of the broadcast frequency repacking process following the 2016-2017 FCC incentive auction.  On February 15, 2019, the station returned to the air on its post-repack facility on channel 12.

Digital television
This station's digital signal is multiplexed:

References

External links

Low-power television stations in the United States
JJM-LD
Television channels and stations established in 1997